Dražica is a settlement southeast of Borovnica in the Inner Carniola region of Slovenia.

Chapel

A chapel in the settlement is dedicated to Mary Help of Christians and belongs to the Parish of Borovnica.

References

External links

Dražica on Geopedia

Populated places in the Municipality of Borovnica